8000 series or 8000 class may refer to:

Computing and electronics 
 PC-8000 Series Japanese model of consumer personal computers 
 Radeon HD 8000 series graphics processing units manufactured by AMD
 Nokia 8000 series cellphone

Train types
 Fujikyu 8000 series electric multiple unit train
 Hankyu 8000 series electric multiple unit train
 Hanshin 8000 series electric multiple unit train
 JR Shikoku 8000 series electric multiple unit train
 Keihan 8000 series electric multiple unit train
 Keio 8000 series electric multiple unit train
 Kita-Osaka Kyuko 8000 series electric multiple unit train
 Kobe New Transit 8000 series electric multiple unit train
 Meitetsu KiHa 8000 series diesel multiple unit train 
 Nankai 8000 series electric multiple unit train
 Odakyu 8000 series electric multiple unit train, operated by Odakyu Electric Railway
 Sapporo Municipal Subway 8000 series subway cars
 Shin-Keisei 8000 series electric multiple unit
 Sotetsu 8000 series electric multiple unit
 Tobu 8000 series electric multiple unit train
 Tokyo Metro 8000 series electric multiple unit train
 Tokyu 8000 series electric multiple unit train, operated by Tokyu Corporation

 Korail Class 8000 electric locomotive class
 PNR 8000 class diesel multiple unit train

Other uses
 International 8000 series class 8 truck

See also
 8000 (disambiguation)